Thomas Courtney may refer to:

 Thomas G. Courtney (born 1947), Iowa state senator
 Thomas J. Courtney (1892–1971), Illinois state senator
 Tom Courtney (born 1933), American athlete

See also
Thomas Courtenay (disambiguation)